Moussa Ouattara (born 5 April 1988) is a Burkinabé retired basketball player. He played in the Belgian Second Division with ASTE Kain and CEP Fleurus.

He represented Burkina Faso's national basketball team at the AfroBasket 2013 in Abidjan, Ivory Coast, where he led his team in points, rebounds, assists and steals.

References

External links
 Eurobasket.com profile 
 REAL GM profile
 Profile at basketstats.fr

1988 births
Living people
Power forwards (basketball)
Centers (basketball)
Burkinabé men's basketball players
People from Bobo-Dioulasso
CEP Fleurus players
21st-century Burkinabé people